A calendar effect (or calendar anomaly) is any market anomaly, different behaviour of stock markets, or economic effect which appears to be related to the calendar, such as the day of the week, time of the month, time of the year, time within the U.S. presidential cycle, decade within the century, etc...

Some people believe that if they do exist, it is possible to use market timing.

Seasonal patterns are not confined to prices; many other systems can exhibit the same kind of calendar effect. However, the term is most often used in an economic context.

Causes
Market prices are often subject to seasonal tendencies because the availability and demand for an item is not constant throughout the year. For example, natural gas prices often rise in the winter because that commodity is in demand as a heating fuel. In the summer, when the demand for heat is lower, prices typically fall.

Examples
Notable calendar effects include:
 Sell in May principle (or Halloween indicator) 
 January effect
 January barometer
 Mark Twain effect
 The Congressional Effect
 Santa Claus rally
 Super Bowl indicator
 Lunar effect
 United States presidential election cycle

Arguments that calendar effects do not exist or are not significant
In their 2001 paper Dangers of data mining: The case of calendar effects in stock returns, Ryan Sullivan et al. argue that there is no statistically significant evidence for calendar effects in the stock market, and that all such patterns are the result of data dredging. However there are contradictory findings and there is an ongoing debate on behavioral economics versus rational choice theory.

According to the efficient-market hypothesis, the calendar anomalies should not exist because the existence of these anomalies should be already incorporated in the prices of securities.

Calendar anomalies are significantly influenced by the financial trend, because the investors' psychology depends on the business cycle, and their behavioral change influences not only the market's performance but also the calendar anomalies (Vasileiou (2015)).

Moreover, some calendar anomalies seem to fade if we do not revise them. E.g. if examine the Turn of the Month effect using the dominant (-1,+3) definition as proposed by Lakonishok and Smidt(1988), this effect weakens, unless we revise the window period/definition (Vasileiou (2018)).

References

 
Market trends
Behavioral finance